Events in the year 1755 in Norway.

Incumbents
Monarch: Frederick V

Events
Hurdal glassverk is established in Hurdal.

Arts and literature

Births

17 October (in Copenhagen, Denmark) - Envold de Falsen, lawyer, poet, actor and statesman (died 1808).

Deaths

See also

References